Alan "Boston" Dvorkis is a professional sports bettor and  poker player. He was a red pro at Full Tilt Poker. Boston is a specialist at Seven-card stud. 

Boston entered his first World Series of Poker event in 1989 and finished 4th in the $1,500 Seven-card stud event. Over the years he had many cashes, mostly in seven card stud. Boston's best finish was 2nd in the 1994, $2500 7 stud event. Not known for no limit, he did play on Poker After Dark in 2007. 

Boston is best known however as a college basketball handicapper. He was featured in the 2001 book The Odds:One Season, Three Gamblers and The Death of Their Las Vegas. He was also featured in the 2016 documentary, The Best Of It. Boston has appeared on radio in Las Vegas and on gambling/poker podcasts.

References

American poker players
Living people
Year of birth missing (living people)